Priyasakhi is a 2005 Indian Tamil-language romance film directed by K. S. Adhiyaman and produced by P. L. Thenappan. The film stars Madhavan and Sadha, while Aishwarya, Ramesh Khanna, Manobala and Kovai Sarala feature in supporting roles. The film is a contemporary Indian take on life and pregnancy topics, and was a remake of the delayed Hindi film Shaadi Karke Phas Gaya Yaar. Production began in December 2004 and the film was released in 14 April 2005.

Plot
Sandhana Krishnan, also known as Sakhi, is an automobile company employee who lives in a joint family. He comes across a model named Priya and becomes attracted to her. Sakhi uses Priya's friend to gain her attention. He later comes across her diary and uses it to make Priya fall for him by posing as her ideal guy. Sakhi tricks Priya and his family tells them lies about how Priya is the ideal bride and fits well into their family and they get married. Unlike Sakhi's conservative family, Priya's wealthy family is 'cosmopolitan' and outgoing. Her mother is a party going socialite, while her father restricts himself to his house and is generally ignored by his wife. Priya is accustomed to being independent. Brought up with modern values, Priya finds it hard to adjust with the family of Sakhi, since they believe in different values. Sakhi goes about life as usual, as in before he got married and puts his family before Priya. He tells Priya that they will be going to the movies but Priya discovers too late that the 'date' includes his entire family. When Priya points out that as newly weds, any wife would want/expect their first outgoing would be just them not a battalion, an angered Sakhi tells her how he wants his family with him. Sakhi hands out the necklace Priya purchases for herself to his sister before his entire family because she admired it, without asking Priya first. Priya is upset, but refrains from making a scene, instead choosing to berate Sakhi in private. Sakhi tells Priya that if she likes that necklace she could use it whenever she wants as it stays in the family anyhow. Priya mentions that Sakhi had no right to offer her stuff to someone else and she's only mentioning that he has a bad attitude so he will correct it. They frequently fight because him and Priya are from two different worlds. Eventually, Priya becomes pregnant. Sakhi is overjoyed but Priya has doubts, as she isn't mentally prepared and also because she thinks, their constant fights will have a negative influence on the child. Priya also argues that it has only been four months into their marriage and she's still too young, but they can have kids later. However, Sakhi wants the child.

Priya is miserable but still decides to carry out the term for Sakhi and mentions to her mother about her situation. Priya's mother makes an appointment for her to have an abortion. Sakhi finds out in time and rushes to the hospital where a reluctant Priya is being pulled towards the operation theatre by her mother. Priya is injured at the hospital in an accident and Sakhi takes her back to his home to recover. How she doesn't lose the baby. They fight again, followed by another fight and Sakhi forgetting Priya's birthday and later wishing her. On her birthday before the party, Priya finds her old diary in Sakhi's suitcase, and the two have an epic argument in which she accuses him of tricking her into loving and marrying him. Sakhi hits her in front of guests and she leaves to go to her parents' house and expresses her desire to get divorced, and also to abort the child. Sakhi challenges her decision and takes her to court. The judge rules that Priya will have to have the baby after which, custody goes to Sakhi. Sakhi moves into Priya's parents' house with her in order to take care of his unborn child, claiming he doesn't trust them, as they might try to abort his baby. After delivery, Priya moves back in with Sakhi's family for a period of two months, to feed and care for the child. As time passes, Priya becomes extremely attached to the child and is unwilling to leave. She eventually agrees to give full custody to Sakhi since she sees how much he loves the baby.

Heartbroken, Priya leaves with her parents. In the car, her mother happily speaks of another possible husband for Priya while Priya is devastated to leave Sakhi and her child. Finally, Priya's father stands up to his wife and encourages Priya to reconcile with her husband. Priya gets out of the car and stands on the road, unsure of what to do and where to go. Sakhi meets her on the streets. The two ask each other for forgiveness and reconcile.

Cast

 Madhavan as Sandhana Krishnan (Sakhi)
 Sadha as Priya
 Rajyalakshmi as Sakhi's mother
 Prathap Pothan as Priya's father
 Aishwarya as Priya's mother
 Ramesh Khanna as Sakhi's elder brother
 Sriranjini as Sakhi's sister-in-law
 Kovai Sarala as Kausalya Raman
 Manobala as Babloo
 Sachu as Sakhi's grandmother
 Neelima Rani as Sakhi's sister
 Lakshmi as Priya's aunt
 Seetha as doctor
 Rekha as Judge
 Vaiyapuri

Production
Adhiyaman began making a project titled Mujhse Shaadi Karogi in 2002, a romantic drama starring Salman Khan and Shilpa Shetty. The project's title was changed to Dil Chura Ke Chal Diye and then to the eventual title Shaadi Karke Phas Gaya Yaar and the film was completed within a year, though the producers delayed the film's release indefinitely. Delays meant that Adhiyaman chose to remake the film and release it swiftly in Tamil as Priyasakhi with a new cast, while he was still waiting for the Hindi film to have a theatrical release. The film was launched in December 2004 with R. Madhavan and Sadha revealed to be portraying the film's lead roles. Madhavan had a chance meeting with Adhiyaman in Mumbai, when the director revealed his intentions of making the film in Tamil. Sadha revealed that Madhavan had convinced her to play the role and had stated that only she could do full justice to the particular role of a young mother, prompting her to sign on for the project for 35 lakh rupees. Prior to Sadha's selection, the team had considered actresseses including Nayanthara, Meera Jasmine and Sonia Agarwal.

The makers teamed up with several brands for product placement throughout the film, including scenes with brands like Sangini Diamonds, Chlor Mint, Kun Hyundai and Western Union Money Transfer. Midst-production, the project experienced delays with reports emerging of a fallout between the lead actor and producer. The team held discussions with Nikita Thukral for a further role in the film, but later opted not to include the role in the film. Production was subsequently completed during June 2005 and the team held an audio launch event at Abirami Mega Mall during the same month.

Soundtrack
The soundtrack features 6 songs composed by Bharadwaj.

Release
The film opened to positive reviews in July 2005 with Sify.com stating that the film was "worth a look", adding that "what works in favour of Priyasakhi is the palpable and terrific on-screen chemistry between the lead pair". Behindwoods.com wrote "Adhiyaman has not done anything new in his story and screenplay, but his characterization of roles is awesome", while also stating that the film has "an attractive look". Indiaglitz.com also gave the game a similar review, stating "Adhiyaman shows he can tell a family story without losing the essential tempo or interest and that is a difficult task in these low-attention span times".

In November 2005, the film was dubbed and released in the Zulu language in South Africa, becoming the first ever Indian film to do so. Though the film did not perform well in India, it had a fifty-day run in South Africa. The film was also dubbed into Hindi as Honeymoon Ke Side Effects.

References

External links
 

2005 films
2000s Tamil-language films
Films scored by Bharadwaj (composer)
Indian romantic drama films
Tamil remakes of Hindi films
Films about Indian weddings
Films shot in Dubai
Films directed by K. S. Adhiyaman
2005 romantic drama films